The Hustyn Chronicle is a 17th-century chronicle detailing the history of Ukraine until 1598. It was written in Church Slavonic, likely by Zacharias Kopystensky.

The Chronicle covers Ukraine's relationship with the Grand Duchy of Moscow and the Grand Duchy of Lithuania, the impact of the Turks and Tartars, and the origin of the Cossacks. It ends with the introduction of the Gregorian calendar (1582), and the Union of Brest (1596).

See also
 East Slavic letopis

References

17th-century works
Church Slavonic manuscripts
Early Modern history of Ukraine
History books about Ukraine
Medieval Ukraine